Distress'd Innocence; Or, The Princess Of Persia is a 1690 tragedy by the English writer Elkanah Settle. It was first performed by the United Company at the Theatre Royal, Drury Lane in London. Incidental music was composed for the play by Henry Purcell.

The original cast included John Bowman as  Isdigerdes, William Mountfort as Hormidas, George Powell as Theodosius, John Hodgson as Audas, George Bright as Cleontes, Edward Kynaston as Otrantes, Samuel Sandford as  Rugildas, John Freeman and John Verbruggen as Persian Magi, Elizabeth Barry as  Orundana, Anne Bracegirdle as Cleomira and Katherine Corey as  Doranthe.

References

Bibliography
 Brown, Frank Clyde. Elkanah Settle. University of Chicago Press, 1910.
 Van Lennep, W. The London Stage, 1660-1800: Volume One, 1660-1700. Southern Illinois University Press, 1960.

1690 plays
West End plays
Tragedy plays
Plays by Elkanah Settle